Prudnik Synagogue was a synagogue in Neustadt in Oberschlesien, Germany (today Prudnik, Poland).

History 
The synagogue was built in 1877 by the architect Smith. It was founded by the industrialist Samuel Fränkel. It was burnt down by the Nazi militias during the Kristallnacht on 9–10 November 1938.

Buildings and structures in Prudnik
Former Reform synagogues in Poland
Synagogues destroyed during Kristallnacht (Germany)

References